Aristolochia westlandii is a species of plant in the family Aristolochiaceae. The leaves are long, narrow and pointed. They are yellow with purple veins and blotches.

References

External links

westlandii
Flora of Hong Kong
Flora of China
Vines
Critically endangered plants
Taxonomy articles created by Polbot